Kelceköy is a village in Mut district of Mersin Province, Turkey. Population of narlı  was  619 as of 2012. The main agricultural products of the village are apricot and olive.

References

Villages in Mut District